Udhampur railway station is situated in municipal committee of Udhampur, Jammu and Kashmir, India.

History
The Uttar Sampark Kranti Express train from New Delhi was the first train to run on this link in 2005. Commuter unreserved passenger trains (DMU) linking Jammu and Udhampur (and Pathankot) also run on a daily basis and are quite popular.

The rail link to Katra was inaugurated and opened  in 2014. Jammu Mail and Uttar Sampark Kranti Express have been extended to Shri Mata Vaishno Devi Katra railway station wef September 2015.

As of now, 39 trains halt at udhampur en route to Shri Mata Vaishno Devi Katra railway station from major cities in India and vice versa, whereas 9 trains (including DMUs and 2 unreserved passenger trains) originate from here.

Platforms
There are a total of 3 platforms and 5 tracks. The platforms are connected by foot overbridge. These platforms are built to accumulate 24 coaches express train. The platforms are equipped with modern facility like display board of arrival and departure of trains.

Udhampur railway station has a separate platform for receiving and unloading freight (goods) trains.

Trains

Some important train that origins/terminates :

 Bhavnagar Terminus–Udhampur Janmabhoomi Express
 Allahabad–Udhampur Superfast Express
 Kota–Udhampur Weekly Express
 Delhi Sarai Rohilla–Udhampur AC Superfast Express
 Jammu Tawi–Udhampur Passenger
 Jammu Tawi–Udhampur DEMU
 Pathankot Junction–Udhampur DEMU

Gallery

See also

 Banihal railway station
 Jammu–Baramulla line
 Northern Railways
 List of railway stations in Jammu and Kashmir
 Udhampur–Jammu highway

References

External links

  Indian Railways

Railway stations in Udhampur district
Transport in Udhampur